Julian Dawes (born 1942) is an English composer.  He is a member of the British Academy of Composers and Songwriters.

He began his musical training in Birmingham, continuing at the Royal College of Music in London. He has worked extensively as an accompanist and teacher, holding posts at Drama Centre London, Birmingham University, the Arts Educational Schools in London, and The Oxford School of Drama.  He has directed the music for numerous theatre productions, and was for five years musical director of The Cherub Company London.

As a composer theatre credits include scores for productions for the Royal Court Theatre, Riverside Studios, Arts Theatre, The Lyric Theatre Hammersmith, Battersea Arts Centre, New End Theatre, Watermill Theatre in Newbury, Bristol Old Vic, The European Festival Antwerp, and the Edinburgh Festival.  His scores for Brecht's Caucasian Chalk Circle and Edward ll are both recognised scores for these plays held by the Brecht Estate in Berlin and have provided the music for many productions. His musical The Braddocks Time was a commission from the Everyman Theatre, Liverpool, where it was followed by a tour of the north of England.  The Sacrifice, a music drama based on a Japanese No play was initially premiered at the Royal Court Theatre, and in a revised version by The Acting Company at the New End Theatre.

In the concert hall he has written a Mandolin Concerto, a commission from the International Music Competition for professional Mandolin players in Schweinfurt, Germany.  He has written a large number of sonatas and suites for a variety of combinations of instruments, as well as thirteen song-cycles including ‘Songs of Ashes’, a setting of fifteen poems by the Polish poet, Jerzy Ficowski, about the Holocaust.  This work has been broadcast in Israel three times.  His output also includes a wide range of other vocal, choral and chamber music.  His cantata ‘The Death of Moses’ for Narrator, Chorus and Chamber Ensemble, and  his Oratorio ‘Ruth’, for Soloists Chorus and Chamber Ensemble were both first performed in London to high acclaim, as was also a recital featuring his chamber music at the Wigmore Hall.  In early 2012 a Sonata Album of his music was released on the Classics Omnibus Label and received critical acclaim.  He has recently completed a new commission from the Alyth Choral Society for a setting of Shirat Hayam (The Song Of The Sea), the biblical song sung by Moses and the Children of Israel as they fled from the Egyptians across the Red Sea (The sea of Reeds) which was premiered in December 2013.

''Amongst his 20th century English influences are the pastoralism and extended tonality of Herbert Howells, the richness of Walton, the elegant delicacy of Berkeley and the jazzy impetus of Rodney Bennett; wider European influences include the caustic irony of Shostakovich and Kurt Weil and the rhythmic impetus of Prokofiev and Stravinsky. Yet Dawes welds from his influences an individual voice that is distinctive and refreshing, displaying assured craftsmanship and characterful invention. (Malcolm Miller 2008)

External links
 juliandawes.com – official website

1942 births
English composers
Living people